Whistones Priory was a priory in Worcestershire, England.

The House of St. Mary Magdalene, at Whistones, of the order of St. Bernard of Clairvaux, located in Barbourne, Worcester, in the parish of Claines. It was founded by Walter de Cantilupe before 1255.  In 1255 the nuns were granted 51 acres of arable land and 2 acres of meadow in Aston Episcopi, which as a result became known as White Ladies Aston.  Additionally the tithes of the demesne lands at Northwick, Newland (Worcester), and lands in Claines. By 1291 the nuns had also acquired a portion of the chapel of Claines, granted by Bishop Giffard in 1283 and the tithes of the chapel of Aston Episcopi, or White Ladies' Aston. 

There is no trace of the actual surrender of Whistones at the time of the Dissolution. It probably took place in 1536 under the statute of that year granting the king the "smaller religious houses" whose annual value was under £200. Jane Burrell, the last prioress, received a pension of £5 10s. on her surrender, and enjoyed the same until 1553.

References

Monasteries in Worcestershire